Seychelles have sent a team to every Commonwealth Games since 1990, and have won seven medals, half of these in boxing.

Medals

References

 
Nations at the Commonwealth Games